Alejandro Fabián Gagliardi (born 6 August 1989) is an Argentine professional footballer who currently plays for Santamarina.

Before joining Morelia, Gagliardi played the first eight years of his career in his home country of Argentina where he played in various first and second division clubs.

Career
Gagliardi spent the first five years of his career playing for Primera B Nacional side Instituto in his hometown of Córdoba. In 2012, he moved to Primera B Nacional side Rosario Central where he spent the majority of the time on the bench, starting only 6 games during the 2012–13 Primera B Nacional season. That season, Rosario Central managed to win the league title, thus were promoted to the Argentine Primera División.

After being part of the triumph Rosario Central side, Gagliardi left the club in search of more playing time, he later signed with Argentine Primera División side All Boys. After playing a total of 99 minutes in six league and one cup match, Gagliardi left the club. He later went back to the Primera B Nacional after signing with Unión de Santa Fe where he played 11 matches. After his short stint with Santa Fe, Gagliardi joined Nueva Chicago for the 2014 Primera B Nacional.

Gagliardi played 19 matches (started 16) and scored 4 goals for Nueva Chicago as he helped the club get promoted to the Argentine Primera División. Gagliardi scored 11 goals in 22 matches for Nueva Chicago during the 2015 Argentine Primera División where he ranked fourth. Despite scoring 11 goals, Nueva Chicago was relegated to the Primera B Nacional after ending in 29th place in the relegation table.

On December 19, 2015, Gagliardi signed with Liga MX side Monarcas Morelia, his first club outside of Argentina.

On 9 August 2016, Monarcas Morelia announced that Gagliardi would be leaving the club in a mutual agreement.

In 2018, Gagliardi signed with Santa Tecla of the Salvadoran Primera División. But a serious injury in his left knee caused him to leave the team in October of the same year.

Honours
Rosario Central
Primera B Nacional: 2012–13

References

External links

1989 births
Living people
Argentine footballers
Argentine expatriate footballers
Association football midfielders
Footballers from Córdoba, Argentina
Instituto footballers
Rosario Central footballers
All Boys footballers
Unión de Santa Fe footballers
Nueva Chicago footballers
Atlético Morelia players
Club Atlético Patronato footballers
Chacarita Juniors footballers
Santa Tecla F.C. footballers
Club Agropecuario Argentino players
Villa Dálmine footballers
Gimnasia y Esgrima de Jujuy footballers
Club y Biblioteca Ramón Santamarina footballers
Primera Nacional players
Argentine Primera División players
Liga MX players
Expatriate footballers in Mexico
Expatriate footballers in El Salvador
Argentine expatriate sportspeople in Mexico
Argentine expatriate sportspeople in El Salvador